Campodea aurunca  is a species of diplura found in the mountains of Italy.

Description
A Campodea (Monocampa) with lp (i.e., lateral posterior macrochaetae) on the urotergite VI; with la (i.e., lateral anterior macrochaetae) and lp on the urotergite VII; with bearded subapical dorsal setae on the tarsi.

Habitat

References
Ramellini, P. 1989. I Diplura dei Monti Ausoni e Aurunci (Lazio): fauna ed ecologia. Boll. Ass. Romana Entomol., 44: 13-28 (1990).
Ramellini, P. 1995. Materiali per un catalogo topografico dei Dipluri italiani (Diplura). Fragm. entomol., 27(1): 15-50.
Dallai, R., E. Malatesta & P. Ramellini. 1995. Apterygota: Collembola, Protura, Microcoryphia e Zygentoma (= Thysanura s.l.), Diplura. In: Minelli, A., S. Ruffo & S. La Posta (eds.). Checklist delle specie della fauna italiana, 33. Bologna (IT), Calderini.

Diplura
Animals described in 1989
Endemic fauna of Italy